Halazepam  is a benzodiazepine derivative that was marketed under the brand names Paxipam in the United States,  Alapryl in Spain, and Pacinone in Portugal.

Medical uses
Halazepam was used for the treatment of anxiety.

Adverse effects
Adverse effects include drowsiness, confusion, dizziness, and sedation.  Gastrointestinal side effects have also been reported including dry mouth and nausea.

Pharmacokinetics and pharmacodynamics 
Pharmacokinetics and pharmacodynamics were listed in Current Psychotherapeutic Drugs published on June 15, 1998 as follows:

Regulatory Information
Halazepam is classified as a schedule 4 controlled substance with a corresponding code 2762 by the Drug Enforcement Administration (DEA).

Commercial production
Halazepam was invented by Schlesinger Walter in the U.S. It was marketed as an anti-anxiety agent in 1981. However, Halazepam is not commercially available in the United States because it was withdrawn by its manufacturer for poor sales.

See also
Benzodiazepines
Nordazepam
Diazepam
Chlordiazepoxide
Quazepam, fletazepam, triflubazam — benzodiazepines with trifluoromethyl group attached

References

External links
 Inchem - Halazepam

Withdrawn drugs
Benzodiazepines
Chloroarenes
GABAA receptor positive allosteric modulators
Lactams
Trifluoromethyl compounds